MaryAnn Baenninger is a psychology professor and the former president of Drew University, a Methodist-affiliated liberal arts college in Madison, New Jersey.

Life
Baenninger received a Bachelor of Arts (B.A.) and Doctor of Philosophy (Ph.D.) in Psychology from Temple University in Philadelphia, Pennsylvania. After serving as a psychology professor on the faculty of The College of New Jersey (formerly Trenton State College) in Ewing, New Jersey, and as an executive associate director with the Middle States Commission on Higher Education in Philadelphia, Baenninger was appointed as president of the College of Saint Benedict in Saint Joseph, Minnesota in 2004. During her tenure at the private Roman Catholic college for women, Baenninger was "credited with building out the school’s study abroad programs, attracting international students and supporting undergraduate research. She also won praise for diversifying the student body and more than doubling the school’s endowment." In February 2014, Drew University's Board of Trustees chose Baenninger as Drew's 13th president and first full-term female president. She succeeded Vivian A. Bull, president emerita of Linfield University, who as president for the interim had replaced Robert Weisbuch after he stepped down as the university's 11th president in June 2012. The Drew Board of Trustees formally recognized Bull as the university's 12th president prior to her retirement in July 2014. On May 18, 2020 the Drew Board of Trustees announced that by mutual decision Baenninger would step down as Drew president on July 31, 2020. On July 14,  2020 the Drew Board of Trustees announced that Thomas J. Schwarz, president emeritus of SUNY Purchase, would succeed Baenninger on August 1, 2020 as interim president. Baenninger serves as a commissioner on the Middle States Commission on Higher Education (MSCHE) and is the past chair and a member of the executive committee of the Council of Independent Colleges (CIC).

Baenninger was married to the late Ronald Baenninger, a former Temple University psychology professor.

Published writings
 Baenninger, MaryAnn, "Institutional Strength from CAO/CFO Partnerships", University Business Magazine, October 2009.
 Baenninger, MaryAnn, "A Golden Thread: The Liberal Arts in the 21st Century", CSB/SJU, 22 April 2005. 
 Baenninger, MaryAnn, "For Women on Campuses, Access Doesn't Equal Success", The Chronicle of Higher Education, 2 October 2011.

References

External links 
 Interview with MaryAnn Baenninger, Council of Independent Colleges

American women psychologists
Temple University alumni
Presidents of Drew University
College of Saint Benedict and Saint John's University
1956 births
Living people
Women heads of universities and colleges